The European Men's Artistic Gymnastics Championships have been staged since 1955, but the men's team all-around has only been staged since 1994.

Medalists

Medal table

References 

European Artistic Gymnastics Championships